The Tsar Tank (Russian: Царь-танк, transcription: Tsar'-tank), also known as the Netopyr' (Russian: Нетопырь, which stands for Pipistrellus a genus of bat) or Lebedenko Tank (Russian: танк Лебеденко), was a  Russian armoured vehicle developed by Nikolai Lebedenko, Nikolay Yegorovich Zhukovsky, Boris Stechkin, and Alexander Mikulin from 1914 onwards. The project was cancelled in 1915 after initial tests deemed the vehicle to be underpowered and vulnerable to artillery fire.

History

The Tsar Tank differed from modern tanks in that it did not use caterpillar tracks— rather, it used a tricycle design. According to the memoirs of Lebedenko, the idea of this machine was prompted by Turkic povozki carts, which, thanks to large diameter wheels, were able to easily traverse bumps and ditches. Additional weapons were also planned under the belly. Each wheel was powered by a 240 hp Maybach engine. Each engine drove a car wheel which transferred power to matching giant wheel by being pressed against its rim. The design had a top speed of 10 mph.

Lebedenko had a private laboratory in Moscow (Sadovo-Kudrinskaya, 23) where he carried out orders from the military. The decisive audience for the project took place in January 1915 during which Lebedenko presented Nicholas II with a clockwork wooden model of his car with an engine based on a gramophone spring. According to the recollections of the courtiers, the Tsar and the engineer played with a model of the machine which briskly ran along the carpet, easily overcoming stacks of two or three volumes of the "Code of Laws of the Russian Empire". The audience ended with the fact that Nicholas II, impressed by the vehicle, ordered 210 thousand rubles to be  allocated from his own funds for the project. Nicholas II kept the wooden model of the tank that Lebedenko made for the demonstration. The ultimate fate of the model is unknown.

Details of the tank were manufactured at a plant in Khamovniki. The huge wheels were intended to cross significant obstacles. However, the rear steerable roller, due to its small size and the incorrect weight distribution of the machine as a whole, got stuck in soft ground almost immediately after the start of the test. The large wheels were unable to pull it out, despite the use of the most powerful propulsion system at that time, consisting of two captured Maybach engines. These were much more powerful than those used on other tanks of the First World War, having been taken from a damaged German airship. This led to a number of failed tests before the High Commission in August 1915, and in September the project was cancelled. Despite this, Stechkin and Mikulin nevertheless began to develop a new engine (AMBES) for the vehicle. However, this attempt was unsuccessful, as were attempts to move the Tsar Tank from its place and pull it out of the test area. Until 1917, the tank was guarded at the test site, but then, due to the outbreak of the Russian revolution, the vehicle was forgotten.

References

External links

Tanks of Russia
World War I tanks of Russia
Trial and research tanks of the Soviet Union
History of the tank